Oymaağaç may refer to:

 Oymaağaç, Ağaçören, village in Aksaray Province, Turkey
 Oymaağaç, Bayramören
 Oymaağaç, Beypazarı, village in Ankara Province, Turkey
 Oymaağaç, Çorum
 Oymaağaç, Elâzığ
 Oymaağaç, Merzifon, village in Amasya Province, Turkey
 Oymaağaç, Vezirköprü, village in Samsun Province, Turkey